Neolemonniera is a genus of plants in the family Sapotaceae first described as a genus in 1918.

Neolemonniera is native to tropical western and west-central Africa.

species
 Neolemonniera batesii (Engl.) Heine - Ivory Coast, Liberia, Gabon, possibly Cameroon
 Neolemonniera clitandrifolia (A.Chev.) Heine - Ivory Coast, Liberia, Sierra Leone
 Neolemonniera ogouensis (Dubard) Heine - Gabon

References

 
Sapotaceae genera
Flora of Africa
Taxonomy articles created by Polbot